Panaspis megalurus, also known as the blue-tailed snake-eyed skink or Nieden's dwarf skink, is a species of lidless skinks in the family Scincidae. The species is endemic to Tanzania.

The tail is very long, more than three times the body length.

References

Panaspis
Skinks of Africa
Reptiles of Tanzania
Endemic fauna of Tanzania
Reptiles described in 1913
Taxa named by Fritz Nieden